Below is a list of notable Armenian architects.

 Arthur Meschian (born 1949) – popular musician and singer, expressing powerful emotional intelligence through a sort of prosperous and righteous poetry about the Armenian heritage to his current community. He's also an architect.
 Garabet Amira Balyan, also known as Karabet Balyan (1800–1866) He was born in İstanbul. He served during the reign of Mahmud II (1808–1839), Abdul Mecid I (1839–1861) and Abdulaziz (1861–1876), and constructed numerous buildings in İstanbul: Dolmabahçe Palace, together with Nigoğayos Balyan (1848–1856), New Çırağan Palace, Yeşilköy Hünkar Kiosk, Old Yıldız Palace, Ortaköy Mosque, together with Nigoğayos Balyan (1854), Nusretiye Clock Tower (1848), Beşiktaş Surp Asdvadzazin Armenian Church (1834), Kuruçeşme Surp Nişan Armenian Church (1834), Beyoğlu Surp Yerrortutyun Church (1838), Kumkapı Surp Asdvadzazin Church, Academy of Fine Arts (former cannon forming) building in Tophane, Fındıklı Cemile and Münire Sultan Palaces, Mimar Sinan University today (1856–1859), İzmit Hünkar Palace, Academy of War, Mausoleum of Mahmut II with fountain (1840), Bakırköy textile factory, Beykoz tannery (1842), Hereke textile factory (1843), Armenian hospital (1832–1834)
 Krikor Balyan (1764–1831) first member of the Balyan family. His major works were: Sarayburnu Palace (burned 1875), Beşiktaş Palace, Çırağan Palace (burned by the Janissaries), Arnavutköy Valide Sultan Palace, Defterdar Sultan Palace, Aynalıkavak Pavilion, Tophane Nusretiye Mosque (1823–1826), Selimiye Barracks (1800, burned 1806), Davutpaşa Barracks (1826–1827), Beyoğlu Barracks, İstanbul Mint, Valide Dam, Topuzlu Dam, Fire Kiosk
 Nigoğayos Balyan, also known as Nigoğos Balyan (1826–1858) founded also a school for domestic architects in order to teach western architecture. His notable works are: Küçük Mecidiye Mosque (1843), Ihlamur Pavilion (1849), Dolmabahçe Mosque, aka Bezm-i Alem Valide Sultan Mosque (1852–1854), Adile Sultan Pavilion, Validebağ (1853), Ortaköy Mosque, together with Garabet Amira Balyan (1854), Küçüksu Pavilion, aka Göksu Pavilion (1857), Armenian Hospital.
 Sarkis Balyan (1835–1899) second son of Garabet Balyan. His most important work is Valide Sultan Kiosk. Sarkis Balyan's notable works are: Beylerbeyi Palace, together with his father Garabet Balyan (1861–1865), Beşiktaş Makruhyan Armenian Primary School (1866) (dedicated to the memory of his young died wife Makruhi), Malta Pavilion (1870), Çırağan Palace (1863–1871), Valide Mosque, together with brother Hagop Balyan (1871), Zeytinburnu Gunpowder Factory (1874), Beşiktaş-Akaretler 138 Terraced Houses (construction began 1874), Esma Sultana Mansion, Ortaköy (1875), Adile Sultana Palace, Kandilli (1876), Dolmabahçe Clock Tower (1895), Ministry of War, the main building of Istanbul Technical University today, Imperial School of Medicine, Galatasaray High School today, Maçka Arsenal, Faculty of Mining of the İstanbul Technical University today, Baltalimanı Coastal Palace, Old kiosk on Galatasaray islet.
 Senekerim Balyan (1768–1833) son of architect Magar and the younger brother of Krikor Balyan. He rebuilt the Beyazit Fire Tower, which was initially constructed 1826 by his brother Krikor in wood, and but destroyed after a fire. His works are: Beyazıt Fire Tower (1828), Ortaköy Surp Asdvadzazdin Armenian Church (1824).
 Léon Gurekian (1871–1950) made contributions in Bulgaria, Ottoman Empire and Italy.
 Karo Halabyan (1897–1959) Soviet architect, led the development of the recovery plan of Stalingrad.
 Armen Hakhnazarian (1941–2009) – Founding Director of Research on Armenian Architecture.
 Miron Merzhanov (1895–1975) Soviet architect, notable for being the de facto personal architect of Joseph Stalin in 1933–1941.
 Michel Mossessian (born 1959) design principal and founder of Mossessian & Partners in London, England.
 Mimar Sinan (15 April 1489 – 17 July 1588) chief Armenian Ottoman architect and civil engineer for sultans Suleiman I, Selim II, and Murad III. He was, during a period of fifty years, responsible for the construction or the supervision of every major building in the Ottoman Empire. More than three hundred structures are credited to his name. He is also considered one of the world's first earthquake engineers.
 Trdat the Architect (circa 940s–1020; Latin: Tiridates) chief architect of the Bagratuni kings of Armenia, whose 10th-century monuments have been argued to be the forerunners of Gothic architecture which came to Europe several centuries later.
 Edouard Utudjian (1905–1975)  creator of the concept "underground urbanism" (urbanisme souterrain) in the 1930s. He found the International Permanent Committee of Underground Technologies and Planning in 1937. He is the author of the books Architecture et urbanisme souterrain (1966) and L'urbanisme souterrain.
 Eudes of Metz, or Odo von Metz, (742–814) – credited as the architect of Charlemagne's Palace of Aachen with the Palatine Chapel, in Aachen.
 Sarkis Lole, Chief Architect of the city of Mardin

See also

 List of architects
 List of Armenians

References

Armenian
Architects